Red emerald may refer to:

Red beryl or Red emerald, the gemstone form of bixbite
Philodendron or Red emerald, a variety of the plant philodendron